Dodole is an album by the Serbian noise-rock band Klopka Za Pionira, released in 2009 (see 2009 in music) on the Ne-ton independent label. This album is considered by many to be their most accessible to date. It took the band nearly two years to record and publish it, while they usually released several albums during one year. Thus it represents their most technically advanced effort (the band stated on their website that the album was "...carefully crafted over many months"). Musically, it contains songs with a more mainstream rock'n'roll approach, standard form and length (almost all of the songs are around three minutes, with lyrics, verses and choruses). The name of the album comes from the lyrics of the song "Pagani" (Serbian for pagans), in which the old pagan Slavic ritual of Dodole is mentioned. The cover illustration by Larisa Acikov depicts burning pagan totems.

Track listing
All lyrics by Mileta Mijatović and music by Damjan Brkić ("with the ritual musicians' trance of Vladimir Lenhart and Đurađ Šimić") as listed on the liner notes
"Plivaj" – 3:16
"Pojedinac" – 6:02
"Čopor" – 3:06
"Pagani" – 3:09
"Pištolj" – 3:13
"Mržnja" – 2:53
"Oči" – 2:23
"Blato" – 2:22
"Gradovi" – 10:33
"Stranac" – 4:50

Personnel
Mileta Mijatović - vocals
Damjan Brkić - guitar, drum machine
Vladimir Lenhart - bass guitar, tapes
Đurađ Šimić - organ, keyboard, vocals on track 5

Production
Recording engineers: Damjan Brkić and Đurađ Šimić
Mixing engineer: Damjan Brkić
Cover design: Larisa Acikov

References

External links 
 Free preview and download from the official website
  by Miloš Tomić
  by Miloš Tomić

Klopka Za Pionira albums
2009 albums